There have been over 150 women's rugby league footballers who have been selected to represent Australia women's national rugby league team since the nation first started playing international matches in 1995.

Jillaroos register
Table last updated 20 November (after the World Cup Final match against New Zealand.

See also

Women's rugby league in Australia
Australia women's national rugby league team
List of Australia national rugby league team players

References

External links 

 

 
Lists of Australian rugby league players
Lists of Australian sportswomen